The Leopold Museum, housed in the Museumsquartier in Vienna, Austria, is home to one of the largest collections of modern Austrian art, featuring artists such as Egon Schiele, Gustav Klimt, Oskar Kokoschka and Richard Gerstl.

It contains the world's largest Egon Schiele Collection.

The more than 5,000 exhibits collected by Elisabeth and Rudolf Leopold over five decades were consolidated in 1994 with the assistance of the Republic of Austria and the National Bank of Austria into the Leopold Museum Private Foundation. In 2001 the Leopold Museum was opened.

The core of the collection consists of Austrian art of the first half of the 20th century, including key paintings and drawings by Egon Schiele and Gustav Klimt, showing the gradual transformation from the Wiener Secession, the Art Nouveau/Jugendstil movement in Austria to Expressionism. The historical context is illustrated by major Austrian works of art from the 19th and 20th centuries.

Controversy

Nazi-looted art 

The Leopold Museum has been involved in numerous controversies concerning Nazi looted art. In 1997, a New York Times profile of Leopold described him as a "too passionate" collector, whose tough tactics had led him to keep Nazi looted art, including Schiele's Portrait of Wally, which had belonged to the Jewish art dealer Lea Bondi Jaray. After many dramatic court actions, a settlement was finally reached after Dr. Leopold's death. “Leopold knew the painting was stolen,” art lawyer Nicolas O’Donnell explained, “He had always known it. With his arrogance and pride out of the way, a real negotiation was possible.”

In 2008, Austria's Green Party and the Israelitische Kultusgemeinde (IKG) publicly accused the museum of "holding art that was stolen by Nazis from Jewish owners" alleging that Houses on the Lake, 1914, by Egon Schiele, had been "stolen by the Nazis from Jewish owner Jenny Steiner". In 2016 the museum reached a settlement concerning five works by Schiele with the heirs of Karl Maylaender, who died after being deported to a labor camp during World War Two.

Naked Men 
In 2012, following a public outcry, the museum's largest street posters for the Nackte Männer (English: Naked Men) exhibition by Ilse Haider, displaying one of the exhibition's most prominent artworks, entitled Vive la France (a depiction of three naked French footballers, with their genitals fully revealed: the first black, the second Arab/Muslim and the third white, by the French artists Pierre et Gilles), were amended by the artists themselves, by the addition of a red ribbon or stripe to cover the players' genitals.

Gallery

See also 
 Portrait of Wally Controversy
List of claims for restitution for Nazi-looted art

References

External links 
 Leopold Museum
 The Leopold Museum's ONLINE COLLECTION 
 Diethard Leopold about the permanent Exhibition of the Leopold Collection (Video by CastYourArt)
 Tracey Emin & Egon Schiele "Where I Want to Go" at Leopold Museum Vienna - WhenWhereWh.at Interview with Diethard Leopold
Virtual tour of the Leopold Museum provided by Google Arts & Culture

Art museums and galleries in Vienna
Buildings and structures in Neubau
Former private collections
Art museums established in 2001
2001 establishments in Austria
Art Nouveau collections
21st-century architecture in Austria